The women's long jump event at the 1994 Commonwealth Games was held at the Centennial Stadium in Victoria, British Columbia.

Medalists

Results

Qualification

Qualification: Qualifying Performance 6.40 (Q) or 12 best performers (q) to the advance to the Final.

Final

References

Long
1994
1994 in women's athletics